Scopula voluptaria is a moth of the  family Geometridae. It is found on Sumatra and Borneo.

Adults have a whitish ground colour with black marginal dots.

References

Moths described in 1938
voluptaria
Moths of Asia